I Want to See the Bright Lights Tonight is the second album released by Richard Thompson, and his first to include his then wife, Linda Thompson, the pair being credited as Richard and Linda Thompson. It was released by Island Records in the UK in 1974. Although the album was never commercially successful, and was critically ignored upon its release (and not released outside of the UK until by Hannibal Records in 1983), it is now considered by several critics to be a masterpiece and one of the finest releases by the two singers, whether working singly or together.

Background 
After the marked lack of success achieved by his first album, Henry the Human Fly, British singer-songwriter/guitarist Richard Thompson started a personal and professional relationship with Linda Peters, a session singer. I Want to See the Bright Lights Tonight was the first album by the duo of Richard and Linda Thompson.

Sessions for the album took place at the Sound Techniques studio in Chelsea, London, over a few weeks during spring 1973, with house engineer John Wood co-producing with Thompson. The album, provisionally titled Hokey Pokey, was recorded on a shoestring budget of £2,500; owing to vinyl shortages, it was not released until 1974.

Where his first album was treated harshly by the critics, the second was eventually hailed as a masterpiece. It is now regarded as a classic of English folk rock and one of the Thompsons' finest achievements.

In the sleeve notes for the 2004 CD re-release, David Suff writes: "Throughout the album Richard's sombre, dark songs are driven by his masterful understated guitar and Linda's haunting spiritual vocals. The songs detail a beautiful yet desolate world of life before the fall, the lives of the homeless, the thief and the inebriate. The songs are thoroughly English in their mood and responsibility, wry observations of the hopelessness of the human condition." Considering the song "End of the Rainbow", Suff writes:Richard denies that the song is totally pessimistic, "there's always hope in the third verse of my songs" yet the overall effect is a magnificent evocation of disillusionment. Thompson's songs are despairing but not self-pitying, leaving the listener with an abiding sense of peace and, paradoxically hope.

Reception 

Initially ignored by reviewers, I Want to See the Bright Lights Tonight later came to be highly regarded. Robert Christgau rated it highly when it was re-released as one-half of Live! (More or Less) noting that "[they] don't sentimentalize about time gone—they simply encompass it in an endless present." When it was re-released in 1984, along with other albums in the Thompsons' catalogue, Kurt Loder writing in Rolling Stone described it as a "timeless masterpiece" with "not a single track that's less than luminous".

More recent reviews are equally complimentary. AllMusic notes that the album is "nothing short of a masterpiece" and calls it "music of striking and unmistakable beauty". Q (May 2007, p. 135): "After his 1971 departure from Fairport Convention, Richard Thompson found his ideal foil in recent bride Linda. A hugely inventive guitarist, he gives full vent to his talent on this dark, brooding album. Indeed, he never quite recaptured the murky demons inside the likes of 'Withered and Died' ever again." In the 2004 CD re-release, Chris Jones at the BBC noted that "Bright Lights...performs the most perfect balancing act between hard-bitten cynicism and honest humanism."

It was voted number 814 in the third edition of Colin Larkin's All Time Top 1000 Albums (2000). In 2003 the album was placed at number 479 on Rolling Stone magazine's list of The 500 Greatest Albums of All Time, and was placed at number 485 in the 2020 edition. The album also appeared in the Mojo "100 Greatest Albums Ever Made".

Writing for Something Else! in 2018, Preston Frazier said, "'The Great Valerio' is just one gem among gems. Richard Thompson's writing is masterful, painting in broad, vivid strokes. Time indeed stands still as Linda Thompson tells the vivid tale, with a hint of detached anxiety... Featuring only Linda's voice and Richard Thompson's Kensington-style picked acoustic, 'The Great Valerio' is dark, yet vivid as it leads the listener to imagine the great fall. Linda Thompson never oversells the proposition, using her voice like the fine instrument it is.

Track listing

Bonus tracks were recorded at the Roundhouse, London, on 7 September 1975.

Personnel

Musicians
Richard Thompson – guitar, vocals, Hammered dulcimer (10), mandolin (1,8), tin whistle (1,7), piano (2), electric piano (5), harmonium (7)
Linda Thompson – vocals
Timi Donald – drums
Pat Donaldson – bass guitar
John Kirkpatrick – accordion, concertina (1,3,7)
Simon Nicol – dulcimer (5)
Brian Gulland – krummhorn (1,6)
Richard Harvey – krummhorn (1,6)
Royston Wood – harmony bass vocals (6, possibly 2)
Trevor Lucas – harmony vocals (5, possibly 2)
The CWS (Manchester) Silver Band (4,7)

Bonus tracks:
Richard and Linda Thompson with John Kirkpatrick, Dave Pegg (bass guitar) and Dave Mattacks (drums).

Technical
John Wood – producer and engineer
Richard Thompson – producer
Cover design – unknown

2004 CD re-release:
Tim Chacksfield – research and project co-ordination
Joe Black – project co-ordination for Universal
David Suff – sleeve note and archive assistance
Phil Smee – CD package design

Notes

Other sources

External links
 

1974 albums
Richard and Linda Thompson albums
Albums produced by John Wood (record producer)
Island Records albums